Nshan Beshiktashlian (born in Istanbul, Ottoman Empire, 1898 - died Paris, France, 1972) was an Armenian poet, writer, satirist, and novelist.

Biography 
Nshan Beshiktashlian was born in Istanbul and left at an early age. Due to his abrupt leave, he was forced to leave school at an early age. However, he began to write at 12 years old with his satirical style of writing. He left Istanbul and continued his writing career in Paris, France where he remained until his death in 1972.

References 

1898 births
1972 deaths
Emigrants from the Ottoman Empire to France
Armenians from the Ottoman Empire
Writers from Istanbul
Date of birth missing
Date of death missing